Akemnji Ndifornyen is a British actor, writer, composer and producer, known for the BBC series Leonardo as a young Niccolò Machiavelli, as well as appearing in the BBC soap opera Doctors as Nathan Bailey from 2004 to 2005. In 2019, he was awarded a BAFTA for his work on the hit BBC comedy series Famalam.

Career
Ndifornyen has appeared in the television shows Casualty, Law & Order: UK, Doctors as Nathan Bailey and The Crouches. He has also starred in feature film Life and Lyrics and in the play The History Boys at the National Theatre. In 2011, he was cast as Niccolò Machiavelli in the program Leonardo. The first series of Leonardo was shot on location in South Africa throughout the second half of 2010. A second series was completed on location in Cape Town and was aired in 2012. In 2019, Akmenji won the BAFTA for Breakthrough Talent for his work as the writer, composer and producer of the BBC Three sketch show Famalam.

It was announced in 2022 that Famalam comedian Gbemisola Ikumelo would be starring in a new BBC series titled "Black Ops" with actor Hammed Animashaun and Ndifornyen. She plays a woman who signs up to be a community police officer to improve her community, but she and her partner get involved with gang leader Ndifornyen over six episodes. The series is destined for terrestrial channel BBC1 and streaming via the BBC's iplayer.

Filmography

References

External links
 

Black British male actors
Living people
Year of birth missing (living people)
British people of Nigerian descent
Place of birth missing (living people)
British male film actors
British male television actors
21st-century British male actors
BAFTA winners (people)
British male writers
British producers
British television composers
British composers